Ab Damil may refer to:
 Ab Damil, Hormozgan
 Ab Damil, Kerman